Mohammad Ali Taheri (born 1956, in Kermanshah, Iran) is an alternative medicine practitioner and cognitive researcher who is the founder of Erfan-e-Halgheh, also called Interuniversal Mysticism, a version of Iranian mysticism Irfan. He is also the founder of the Erfan Halghe Cultural Institute.

Taheri has founded two complementary medicine treatments Faradarmani and Psymentology and has been honored with doctorate degree for his research.

He is currently based in Canada after the grant of asylum by the Government of Canada.

Life

Early years
Mohammad Ali Taheri was born on 1956 in Kermanshah, Iran and received his primary education from his hometown. Later, they moved to Tehran for better opportunities.

Described as a child prodigy, Taheri was very curious since childhood and loved staring at the stars at nights. He wanted to know about the universe, secret of creation, and purpose of life. Due to his desire to know about the stars and their cause, he designed and made airplanes to get closer to them during his adolescence, in Tehran.

At the age of sixteen, he built a helicopter in the courtyard of his house. This invention created various problems for his family as the Security and Intelligence Service of Iran (SAVAK) believed that it is impossible that a schoolboy can design such a thing and suspected a foreign hand. Finally, after a long investigation and presentation of the Dictionary of Aviation Technical Terms written by him, they were convinced and changed their mind.

Tahiri studied environmental engineering. Meanwhile, he continued his investigation about stars and started studying cosmology, influenced by Persian mystic, Rumi. Later, he went to Turkey where he studied briefly at the Middle East Technical University. As a professional, he is trained as a mechanical engineer.

Upon his return to Iran, he founded an engineering firm, Tiva Kian Engineering and Design Company, and designed mushroom production and flour factories. During the Iran-Iraq War, he designed two machine guns and made a list of innovations in military technology which were praised by Akbar Hashemi Rafsanjani in his memoir.

Erfan-e-Halgheh 

According to Taheri, he has never followed any specific Sufi path or particular religion. He used to find answers to his questions through books and documents. He also used to meditate deeply.

During his self-study of cosmology, he began to believe that science and spirituality can converge in a single quest. Therefore, found two ways to healing exclusively based on a path of self-understanding Faradarmani and Psymentology.

As his quest for knowledge and desire to find truth of life intensified, Taheri started receiving intuitions which he used to explore and reflect upon. After receiving intuitions, Taheri started to rationalize these in the first decade. Afterwards, he started the work to test the intuitions he received. Based on work and testing, he started teaching about his knowledge to his friends and family in private. To cure different types of diseases, Taheri introduced a new healing method which was later called Faradarmani.

According to Taheri, Erfan-e-Halgheh reveals mysteries of the Quran and of the Persian poetry written by legendary poets such as Mowlana and Hafez.

In the 2000s, he founded Erfan-e-Halgheh (Circle of Mysticism), an arts and culture institute located in Tehran, which promotes healing concepts. It is part of Inter-universal Mysticism, a spiritual movement or school of thought, which he started about forty years ago to promote mental wellness and physical health. The movement became wildly popular in urban centers of Iran. At its peak, the movement had more than two million followers.

Erfan-e-Halgheh movement promotes self-help style therapeutic spirituality and understanding of the universe. It is particularly influential among the educated Iranians and its seminars and clinics are spread across Iran and in California.

Teachings 
Based on his work and research, Taheri initially started teaching about his knowledge to his friends and family in private. Later, after developing Erfan-e-Halgheh, he publicized his knowledge by teaching it with structured lessons. Initially, classes were small with few students. In 2001, classes were transferred to the official institution and later at University of Tehran, a top-ranked university in Iran. Meanwhile, Taheri was also giving interviews to further dissipate his knowledge.

In the start, Erfan-e-Halgheh was designed by him to be studied in six levels, but later two more levels were added to teach the subject in detail. Each level lasted six weeks with one four-hour each week. In level one, students were taught about Faradarmani which is used to heal different diseases and its purpose is to get acquaintance with divine intelligence in practical form. In Erfan-e-Halgheh, it is a first step on the spiritual development path.

Later, Taheri also started to teach Faradarmani and Psymentology at the institute he founded in 2006. Classes overwhelmed by students were held where everything was videotaped. He also wrote manuals and guides which were released with the official license of the Iranian Government. They won dozens of awards and acknowledgments in their field.

He has also taught alternative medicine and alternative therapies at the University of Tehran.

In 2010, he has to stop his teachings, when his popularity was at the peak, due to his arrest by the government.

Imprisonment, trial and release, 2010–2019 
In 2009, a group linked to the Iranian Revolutionary Guard Corps (IRGC) alarmed by his rising popularity and called it a threat to the national security. Classes filled with thousand of students were not considered safe.

A dissident spiritualist, Taheri was arrested by the Revolutionary Guards Intelligence Service in 2010 on charges of acting against national security. He was held in solitary confinement for 67 days. Before his arrest, he was free to deliver public lectures held at the Tehran University and publish books without any restrictions.

In 2011, he was again arrested on the charges of Moharebeh (enmity against god). Many of his followers around the city of Isfahan were also detained. Later, on May 4, 2011, he was sentenced on charges of “founding a religious cult”.

Taheri was interrogated again in the summer of 2014 on charges of corruption on earth, and was eventually sentenced to death in court in May 2015. The UN high commissioner for Human Rights called this death sentence  an “absolute outrage”. His sentence was annulled later the same year.

He was due to be released on February 7, 2016, after serving a full five-year sentence and paying the fine, but was prevented from being released on new charges being brought.

In August 2017, Islamic Revolutionary Court, presided over by Judge Ahmadzadeh, convicted Taheri on charges of corruption on earth; this conviction was overturned by Branch 33 of the Supreme Court for the second time. In September 2017, this second sentence and related arrests of his followers was condemned by the US Department of State spokesperson Heather Nauert. Nauert said that the alleged charges are against Iran's commitment to human rights and urged Iranian authorities to reverse the conviction and death sentence.

In August 2018, he was charged with corruption on earth for the third time by Judge Abolqasim Salavati in Branch 15 of the Revolutionary Court on a charge of five years' imprisonment; this charge should have been re-examined by the appeals court, but this never took place.

In September 2018, Taheri was charged again with apostasy. In a letter to Ahmad Shahid, a former UN human rights rapporteur for Iran, Taheri reported that he had been forced to fabricate confessions through psychological pressure and torture by IRGC interrogators.

Prisoner of conscience 
In October 2018, Vice-Chair of the United States Commission on International Religious Freedom, Gayle Conelly Manchin, adopted Mohammad Ali Taheri as a religious prisoner of conscience which is part of USCIRF’s Religious Prisoners of Conscience Project.

Campaign to release Taheri 
In 2012, his mother left Iran and moved to Canada to start a campaign for the release of Taheri with help of human rights activists.

In August 2015, sit-ins were held by Taheri's students in Tehran and Qom and demanded to overturn his death sentence. Protests were also held in twenty cities around the world, including Edmonton, calling for his release from the prison.
 
In October 2016, more than thirty thousand people in Canada demanded the release of Mohammad Ali Taheri through petitions and mailboxes.

United Nation Human Rights condemned Taheri's imprisonment many times in its reports during his arrest period.

Release and exile 
Taheri, in a letter to the Iranian president on January 13, 2019, called for the removal of his Iranian citizenship in protest against injustice.

In April 2019, he was released after seven and a half years of his last arrest. After his release, he left Iran and sought and was subsequently granted asylum in Canada on March 8, 2020.

Family 
Taheri is married and the couple has two children. Taheri' mother, Ezat Taheri, and sister, Azardokht Taheri, are based in Canada.

Awards and honors 
Taheri has received dozen of awards and honors. In March 2011, he received honorary doctorate degree from the president of the University of Traditional Medicine of Armenia for founding, the Iranian complementary medicine, Faradarmani.

He has also received gold medals and certificates from Belgium, Romania, Russia, and South Korea for his work and research.

Works 
Taheri has written dozens of books and more than twenty-five articles on his research work. Several of them were published in Iran with permission from the Ministry of Culture and Islamic Guidance, Iran. Some of his books have also been published in Armenia.

His books are widely read in Iran. For example, his book, Ensan az Manzari Digar (Human from Another Outlook), which is considered the founding text of Erfan-e-Halgheh, became a best-seller in Iran and went into eight imprints, a total of 90,000 prints between 2007 and 2009.

 Taheri, Mohammad Ali (2006). Cosmic mysticism (ring) (in Persian)
 Taheri, Mohammad Ali (2007). Man, from another perspective (in Persian)
 Taheri, Mohammad Ali (2010). The relationship between ethics and mysticism (in Persian)
 Taheri, Mohammad Ali (2011). Man and knowledge (in Persian)

References

Works cited 
 
 
 

Living people
1956 births
People from Kermanshah
21st-century mystics
Hunger strikers
Iranian refugees
Iranian academics
Spiritual writers
Spiritual teachers
Inmates of Evin Prison
Iranian Kurdish people
Iranian company founders
People acquitted of crimes
Iranian emigrants to Canada
20th-century Iranian writers
21st-century Iranian writers
Academic staff of the University of Tehran
People in alternative medicine
Prisoners and detainees of Iran
Iranian prisoners and detainees
Alternative medicine researchers
People charged with apostasy in Iran
Prisoners sentenced to death by Iran
Amnesty International prisoners of conscience held by Iran